John Lindberg (born March 16, 1959) is an American jazz double-bassist.

Early life 
Lindberg was born in Royal Oak, Michigan. He began his professional career at the age of 16, eventually moving to New York City in 1977.

Career 
After moving to New York, he played with the Human Arts Ensemble alongside Joseph Bowie and Bobo Shaw. In 1977, with James Emery and Billy Bang, Lindberg co-founded the String Trio of New York. In 1980 he formed a trio with Jimmy Lyons and Sunny Murray. From 1980 to 1983 he lived in Paris, playing there solo and with Murray and John Tchicai. He has recorded extensively as a leader. John Lindberg studied bass with the bassist from the Battle Creek, Michigan symphony orchestra and jazz musician Roscoe Mitchell.

Discography

As leader
 Comin' and Goin (Leo, 1980)
 Unison (Cecma, 1981) with Marty Ehrlich
 Dimension 5 (Black Saint, 1981)
 Team Work (Cecma, 1982) - with Hugh Ragin
 Relative Reliability (West Wind, 1982)
 Give and Take (Black Saint, 1982)
 Haunt of the Unresolved (Nato, 1983)
 The East Side Suite (Sound Aspects. 1983)
 Trilogy of Works for Eleven Instrumentalists (Black Saint, 1984)
 As Tears Go By (ITM, 1987)
 Shoot First (Ear Rational, 1989) with Eric Watson
 Dodging Bullets (Black Saint, 1992)
 Quartet Afterstorm (Black Saint, 1994)
 Resurrection of a Dormant Soul (Black Saint, 1996)
 Luminosity:Homage to David Izenzon (Music & Arts, 1996)
 Bounce (Black Saint, 1998)
 The Catbird Sings (Black Saint, 2000)
 A Tree Frog Tonality (Between the lines, 2000)
 Two by Five (Between the lines, 2002)
 Ruminations Upon Ives and Gottschalk (Between the lines, 2003)
 Winter Birds (Between the lines, 2005)
 Duets 1 (Between the lines, 2006) with Karl Berger
 (A)live at Roulette, NYC (Jazzwerkstatt, 2011)
 Born in an Urban Ruin (Clean Feed, 2016) (& BC3) 
 Western Edges (Clean Feed, 2016) (wRaptor Trio)

With the String Trio of New York
First String (Black Saint, 1979)
Area Code 212 (Black Saint, 1981)
Common Goal (Black Saint, 1983)
Rebirth of a Feeling (Black Saint, 1983)
Natural Balance (Black Saint, 1986)
Octagon (Black Saint, 1992)
Blues...? (Black Saint, 1993)
Frozen Ropes (Barking Hoop, 2005)

As sideman
With Anthony Braxton
 Creative Orchestra (Köln) 1978 (hatART, 1978 [1995])
 Performance (Quartet) 1979 (hatART, 1979 [1981])
 Seven Compositions 1978 (Moers Music, 1979)
 Six Duets (1982) (Cecma, 1982)
 Four Compositions (Quartet) 1983 (Black Saint, 1983)
 Six Compositions (Quartet) 1984 (Black Saint, 1984)
 Prag 1984 (Quartet Performance) (Sound Aspects, 1984)
 
With Human Arts Ensemble
Junk Trap (Black Saint, 1978)
Live! Volume 1 (Circle, 1978)

With Susie Ibarra
Flower by Flower (Tzadik, 2002)

With Jimmy Lyons and Sunny Murray
 Jump Up / What to Do About (Hat Hut, 1981)

With Kevin Norton
 Intuitive Structures (Cadence, 2003)
 Time-Space Modulator (Barking Hoop, 2004)

With Wadada Leo Smith
 Lake Biwa (Tzadik, 2004)
 Tabligh (Cuneiform, 2008)
 Spiritual Dimensions (Cuneiform, 2009)
 Heart's Reflections (Cuneiform, 2011)
 The Great Lakes Suites (TUM, 2014)
 Celestial Weather (TUM, 2015)
 America's National Parks (Cuneiform, 2016)

With BLOB 
 "The Awakening" (2007) (with Ted Orr, Bill Bacon, Don Davis and Karl Berger)
 "Halloween" (Clinical Archives 2008) (with Ted Orr and Harvey Sorgen)
 "Quantum Fugue" (Lindy Editions 2008) (with Ted Orr and Harvey Sorgen)
 "Earphonious Swamphony" (Innova Recordings 2009) (with Ted Orr,Harvey Sorgen, and Ralph Carney)
 "You Can'y Get Ther From There" (Lindy Editions 2009) (with Ted Orr and Harvey Sorgen)
 "A Night At The Opera" (2010) (with Ted Orr, Jake Sorgen, and Harvey Sorgen)
 "Metalshop" (2010) (with Ted Orr and Harvey Sorgen)
 "BLOB Goes To Mars" (2011) (with Ted Orr, Harvey Sorgen, Don Davis, and Mars Williams)
 Third Ear" (2011) (with Ted Orr, Harvey Sorgen, and Curtis Bahn)
 "Summer Shorts" (2012) (with Ted Orr and Harvey Sorgen)

References

External links
John Lindberg at Discogs

American jazz double-bassists
Male double-bassists
Jazz musicians from Michigan
Living people
American jazz composers
American male jazz composers
20th-century American composers
1959 births
21st-century double-bassists
20th-century American male musicians
21st-century American male musicians
Human Arts Ensemble members
String Trio of New York members
20th-century jazz composers
NoBusiness Records artists
Leo Records artists
Black Saint/Soul Note artists